
This is a list of past and present members of the Académie des Beaux-Arts in Section I: Painting.

Seat #1

 elected 1795: Gérard van Spaendonck (1746–1822)
 1822: Louis Hersent (1777–1860)
 1860: Émile Signol (1804–1892)
 1892: Luc-Olivier Merson (1846–1920)
 1921: Paul Chabas (1869–1937)
 1938: Édouard Vuillard (1868–1940)
 1941: Pierre Eugène Montézin (1874–1946)
 1947: Charles Fouqueray (1871–1956)
 1957: Yves Brayer (1907–1990)
This seat was transferred to section VII in 1998.

Seat #2

 1795: François-André Vincent (1746–1816)
 1816: Pierre-Paul Prud'hon (1763–1823)
 1823: Jean-Joseph-Xavier Bidauld (1758–1846)
 1846: Jacques Raymond Brascassat (1804–1867)
 1867: Louis-Nicolas Cabat (1812–1893)
 1893: Jean-Joseph Benjamin-Constant (1845–1902)
 1902: Ferdinand Humbert (1842–1934)
 1935: Émile Aubry (1880–1964)
 1966: Félix Labisse (1905–1982)
 1990: Pierre Carron (1932–2022)

Seat #3

 1795: Jean-Baptiste Regnault (1754–1829)
 1829: François-Joseph Heim (1787–1865)
 1865: Jean-Léon Gérôme (1824–1904)
 1904: Carolus-Duran (1838–1917)
 1919: Ernest Laurent (1859–1929)
 1930: Henri Le Sidaner (1862–1939)
 1941: Jean Dupas (1882–1964)
This seat was eliminated in 1967.

Seat #4

 1795: Nicolas-Antoine Taunay (1755–1830)
 1830: François Marius Granet (1779–1849)
 1850: Joseph-Nicolas Robert-Fleury (1797–1890)
 1890: François-Louis Français (1814–1897)
 1897: Antoine Vollon (1833–1900)
 1900: Pascal Dagnan-Bouveret (1852–1929)
 1930: Jean-Pierre Laurens (1875–1932)
 1932:  (1877–1957)
 1958:  (1907–1997)
 1999: Olivier Debré (1920–1999)
 2001: Jean Cortot (1925–2018)

Seat #5

 1803: Vivant Denon (1747–1825)
 1825: Jean-Dominique Ingres (1781–1867)
 1867: Alexandre Hesse (1806–1879)
 1879: Jules-Élie Delaunay (1828–1891)
 1891: Jules Joseph Lefebvre (1834–1911)
 1912: Paul-Albert Besnard (1849–1934)
 1935: Fernand Sabatté (1874–1940)
 1941: Louis-François Biloul (1874–1947)
 1948:  (1889–1967)
 1968:  (1913–2000)
 2015:  (born 1945)

Seat #6

 1803: Ennio Quirino Visconti (1751–1818)
 1818: Guillaume Guillon-Lethière (1760–1832)
 1832: Merry-Joseph Blondel (1781–1853)
 1853: Jean-Hippolyte Flandrin (1809–1864)
 1864: Charles Louis Müller (1815–1892)
 1892: Édouard Detaille (1848–1912)
 1913: Marcel Baschet (1862–1941)
 1942: Robert Poughéon (1886–1955)
 1955:  (1901–1973)
 1975: Georges Mathieu (1921–2012)
 2017: Gérard Garouste (born 1946)

Seat #7

 1809: François-Guillaume Ménageot (1744–1816)
 1816: Étienne-Barthélémy Garnier (1759–1849)
 1849: Léon Cogniet (1794–1880)
 1881: Léon Bonnat (1833–1922)
 1923: Jean-Louis Forain (1852–1931)
 1932: Maurice Denis (1870–1943)
 1945: Paul Jouve (1878–1973)
 1974: Bernard Buffet (1928–1999)
 2005: Vladimir Veličković (1935–2019)
 2021: Ernest Pignon-Ernest (born 1942)

Seat #8

 1812: François Gérard (1770–1837)
 1837: Jean-Victor Schnetz (1787–1870)
 1870: Paul Baudry (1828–1886)
 1886: Jules Breton (1827–1906)
 1906: Gabriel Ferrier (1847–1914)
 1917: Henri Jean Guillaume Martin (1860–1943)
 1944: Gustave Louis Jaulmes (1873–1959)
 1960: André Planson (1898–1981)
 1983: Jean Bertholle (1909–1996)
 1997: Guy de Rougemont (1935–2021)

Seat #9

 1816: Pierre Guérin (1774–1833)
 1833: Michel Martin Drolling (1786–1851)
 1851: Jean Alaux (1786–1864)
 1864: Henri Lehmann (1814–1882)
 1882: Gustave Boulanger (1824–1888)
 1888: Gustave Moreau (1826–1898)
 1898: Aimé Morot (1850–1913)
 1913: Henri Gervex (1852–1929)
 1929: André Devambez (1867–1944)
 1945: Willem van Hasselt (1882–1963)
 1965:  (1893–1969)
 1969: Jacques Despierre (1912–1995)
 1997: Chu Teh-Chun (1926–2014)
 2018:  (born 1961)

Seat #10

 1803: Jacques-Louis David (1748–1825)
 1816: Jean-Jacques-François Le Barbier (1738–1826)
 1826: Horace Vernet (1789–1863)
 1863: Alexandre Cabanel (1823–1889)
 1889: Jean-Jacques Henner (1829–1905)
 1905: Léon Augustin Lhermitte (1844–1925)
 1926: Émile-René Ménard (1862–1930)
 1930: George Desvallières (1861–1950)
 1951: Jean Bouchaud (1891–1977)
 1977: Jean Carzou (1907–2000)
 2002: Zao Wou-Ki (1921–2013) 
 2016: Jean-Marc Bustamante (born 1952)

Seat #11

 1816: Anne-Louis Girodet (1767–1824)
 1825: Charles Thévenin (1764–1838)
 1838: Jérôme-Martin Langlois (1779–1838)
 1839: Auguste Couder (1790–1873)
 1874: Ernest Hébert (1817–1908)
 1909: Raphaël Collin (1850–1916)
 1918: Adolphe Déchenaud (1868–1926)
 1929: Lucien Simon (1861–1945)
 1946:  (1891–1981)
 1984:  (1933–2018)
 2020: Catherine Meurisse (born 1980)

Seat #12

 1816: Antoine Gros (1771–1835)
 1835: Abel de Pujol (1787–1861)
 1861: Jean-Louis-Ernest Meissonier (1815–1891)
 1891: Jean-Paul Laurens (1838–1921)
 1921: Jules-Alexis Muenier (1863–1942)
 1943: René-Xavier Prinet (1861–1946)
 1946: Nicolas Untersteller (1900–1967)
 1968: Roger Chastel (1897–1981)
 1982: Georges Wakhévitch (1907–1984)
This seat was transferred to section VII in 1987.

Seat #13

 1816: Charles Meynier (1768–1832)
 1832: Paul Delaroche (1797–1856)
 1857: Eugène Delacroix (1798–1863)
 1863: Nicolas-Auguste Hesse (1795–1869)
 1869: Jules Eugène Lenepveu (1819–1898)
 1898: Fernand Cormon (1845–1924)
 1924: Edgar Maxence (1871–1954)
 1955: Lucien Fontanarosa (1912–1975)
 1977: Hans Hartung (1904–1989)
 1991:  (1921–1999)
 2001:  (born 1930)

Seat #14

 1816: Carle Vernet (1758–1836)
 1836: François-Édouard Picot (1786–1868)
 1868: Isidore Pils (1815–1875)
 1876: William Bouguereau (1825–1905)
 1905: François Flameng (1856–1923)
 1923: Emile Friant (1863–1932)
 1933: Paul Albert Laurens (1870–1934)
 1935: Jacques-Émile Blanche (1861–1942)
 1943: Louis-Marie Désiré-Lucas (1869–1949)
 1950: Jean-Gabriel Domergue (1889–1962)
 1964: Jean Lurçat (1892–1966)
This seat was eliminated in 1967.

Sources
 List of members @ the Académie des Beaux-Arts website.

See also
List of Académie des Beaux-Arts members: Sculpture
List of Académie des Beaux-Arts members: Architecture
List of Académie des Beaux-Arts members: Engraving
List of Académie des Beaux-Arts members: Music
List of Académie des Beaux-Arts members: Unattached
List of Académie des Beaux-Arts members: Cinema

 Painting
French painters
Lists of French people
Lists of painters